Reggie Lee (born October 26, 1973, died February 19,2021) is a former Arena Football League offensive lineman/defensive lineman for the Orlando Predators.

NCAA career
Lee attended Florida A&M University in 1994 and 1995. He finished his two-year career there with 14 sacks and 186 tackles (19 for losses), and as a senior, he was a second-team All-America selection.

References

1973 births
Living people
American football defensive linemen
Orlando Predators players